Vattamkulam is a village in Malappuram district of the Indian state of Kerala. Vattamkulam means "Round Pond".

Geography 
Vattamkulam is located near Edappal.  A village in the fertile valley of the Bharatapuzha/Nila River. Sukapuram is a nearby village. Many hills and mountains are nearby.

History
It was important as a marketing hub for areca nut (kooradakka) in the 1960s. In the 1970s, the once-sleepy village sent most of its able bodied men to the Persian Gulf countries. Almost every family sent one or more men to the Gulf. The name reportedly derives from the "valiya vattamkulam" (Big round pond) located at Chembazha Thazham. The Panchayat was formed in 1962 covering 56 square kilometres and a population of 38,254. Illams abound in this place and the historic Veda Gramam of Sukapuram is there.

Festivals and religion
The Dhakshina Moorthi Temple and Kulankara Devi Temple are situated in Sukapuram. Sukapuram is well known for vedhagramam and yagas.

Kulamkara pooram is a local festival. In 2009 December people came from as far away as Germany. A helicopter ride is offered.

Potturkavu makaram is known for Vanibham (trade festival) and Kaazhcha Varavukal by various villages. Eringikkal pattu mahotsavam is celebrated during Malayalam month Meenam. Bhagawati Pattu.

Kundurummal Masjid is centuries old and has tombstones dating to the British Raj. It has a Madrasa with dozens of students from across Kerala. Neeliyad juma masjid is there. The main Juma Masjid at Vattamkulam center is reputed to be over 150 years old. It has a Madrasa with dozens of students. Its head Ustad Abdul Vadood Nizami has a PhD which is rare among the Ulema.

Economy
The main agriculture activity is rice production, along with arcenut, pepper, banana etc.

Landmarks
 Darul Hidaya Dawa College
 D.H.O.H.S.S Pookkarathara
 A.W.H. College, Anakkara
 Kakramkunnu Temple, Anakkara
 Thanvirul Vildan Madrasah
 Malabar Dental College, Chekannur
 Thallu Parambil Bhagavathi Temple, chekannur
 Thirumaniyoor Mahadeva Keshethram, Kandanakam
 Technical Higher Secondary School, Vattamkulam
 Kundurummal Jum'a Masjid
 Vattamkulam Jum'a Masjid
 Government UP School, Vattamkulam
 Kavupra Shiva God Temple
 Eruvaprakkunnu ayyappa temple
neeliyad Jum'a Masjid
CPNUPS VATTAMKULAM
Kallanikavu Bhagavathi temple Mudur
Sree Vivekananda Vidhyanikethan Scool, Kavupra

Culture
The Public library named Grameena Vayanashala holds gatherings and dialogues.

Transport
Vattamkulam connects to other parts of India through Kuttippuram town.  National highway No.66 passes through Edappal and connects to Goa and Mumbai.  The southern stretch connects to Cochin and Trivandrum. National Highway No.966 connects to Palakkad and Coimbatore.  The nearest airport is at Kozhikode.  The nearest major railway station is at Kuttippuram.

References

Villages in Malappuram district
Kuttippuram area